Yelü Diela was the younger brother of the Liao dynasty founder Yelü Abaoji. He invented the "Khitan small script" to accommodate the more agglutinative Khitan language around the year 925. The script was based partly on the earlier "Khitan large script" or Chinese-like logographic writing, but was also inspired by the vertically written Old Uyghur alphabet that was shown to him by an ambassador.

References

External links
Liao (Khitan) literature and script

Creators of writing systems
Year of death unknown
Year of birth unknown

Yelü clan
10th-century Khitan people